{{DISPLAYTITLE:C16H10}}
The molecular formula C16H10 (molar mass: 202.25 g/mol, exact mass: 202.0783 u) may refer to:

 Dibenzopentalene
 Fluoranthene
 Pyrene

Molecular formulas